National Youth (GN) is the youth wing of the Italian right-wing political party Brothers of Italy. It was founded on 5 May 2014.

History 
National Youth was founded on 5 May 2014 under the presidency of Marco Perissa. On 24 September 2017, National Youth held its first National Congress and changed its own leadership, with Fabio Roscani replacing Marco Perissa as National President.

Political positions 
On its official web page National Youth states that it believes in the primacy of the Spirit over Matter; in the Christian roots of Europe (against the Maastricht Treaty). It is against abortion, in favour to meritocracy but also to social justice. National Youth supports the overcoming of the dichotomy between left and right in favor of the national interest. The movement also carries out campaigns related to schools, university and youth employment.

National Youth engaged in political campaigns related to the social right: it conducted campaigns and demonstrations in opposition to dismissals facilitated by the Workers' Statute reform, and to modifications to wealth calculation methods.

The organization also engaged in political campaigns and statements in support to the preservation of Italian and Christian identity, traditions and roots: it supported the exhibition of the Nativity scene in schools, against same-sex parenting, drug consumption and liberalization and against illegal immigration.

Keeping in line with Italian right-wing youth organizations, National Youth also claims political and moral links with the Italian Youth Front and with its activists who were murdered during the Years of Lead.

Organization 
The movement is headed by the National President. As of 2021, the National President is Fabio Roscani.

In order to assist the national president, there is an Office of the President, currently appointed.

National Executive Board 
The National Executive Board (Office of the President) consists of 4  members:
Francesco Di Giuseppe
Chiara La Porta
Mario Pozzi
Stefano Cavedagna

See also
 Brothers of Italy

References 

Brothers of Italy
Youth wings of conservative parties
Youth wings of political parties in Italy
Youth organizations established in the 2010s